When a work's copyright expires, it enters the public domain. The following is a list of works that enter the public domain in 2017. Since laws vary globally, the copyright status of some works are not uniform.

Entering the public domain in countries with life + 70 years
With the exception of Belarus, a work enters the public domain in Europe 70 years after the creator's death, if it was published during the creator's lifetime. The list is sorted alphabetically and includes a notable work of the creator that entered the public domain on January 1, 2017. This term also applies to unpublished works in the United States (otherwise see below).

Entering the public domain in countries with life + 50 years
In most countries of Africa and Asia, as well as Canada, Belarus, Bolivia, New Zealand, Egypt and Uruguay, a work enters the public domain 50 years after the creator's death.

Entering the public domain in Australia

In 2004 copyright in Australia changed from a "plus 50" law to a "plus 70" law, in line with America and the European Union. But the change was not made retroactive (unlike the 1995 change in the European Union which brought some e.g. British authors back into copyright). Hence the work of an author who died before 1955 is normally in the public domain in Australia; but the copyright of authors was extended to 70 years after death for those who died in 1955 or later, and no more Australian authors will come out of copyright until 1 January 2026 (those who died in 1955).

Entering the public domain in the United States

The Copyright Term Extension Act means no published works would enter the public domain in this jurisdiction until 2019. The exception are unpublished works, which are subject to 70 years after the death of the creator, as above.

See also 
 2012 in public domain
 2013 in public domain
 2014 in public domain
 2015 in public domain
 2016 in public domain
 2018 in public domain
 2019 in public domain
 2020 in public domain
 2021 in public domain
 2022 in public domain
 List of countries' copyright lengths
 Public Domain Day
 Creative Commons
 Public Domain
 Over 300 public domain authors available in Wikisource (any language), with descriptions from Wikidata
 1946 in literature, 1956 in literature, 1966 in literature and 1976 in literature

Lists of authors 
 Authors listed in Wikidata who died in 1946
 Over 300 public domain authors available in Wikisource (any language), with descriptions from Wikidata

References

Public domain
Public domain